Sinomphisa is a genus of moths of the family Crambidae described by Eugene G. Munroe in 1958.

Species
Sinomphisa jeannelalis (Marion & Viette, 1956)
Sinomphisa junctilinealis (Hampson, 1918)
Sinomphisa plagialis (Wileman, 1911)

References

Spilomelinae
Taxa named by Eugene G. Munroe
Crambidae genera